The cycling competitions at the 2012 Olympic Games in London took place at five venues between 28 July and 12 August. The venues were the London Velopark for track cycling and BMX, and Hadleigh Farm, in Essex, for mountain biking. The road races took place over a course starting and ending in The Mall in central London and heading out into Surrey, while the time trials started and finished at Hampton Court Palace in Richmond upon Thames. Eighteen events were contested and around 500 athletes participated.

Cycling events have been contested in every Summer Olympics programme since the first modern Olympiad in 1896 alongside athletics, artistic gymnastics, fencing and swimming. Compared to the cycling at the 2008 Olympics, there were many changes in the Olympic track cycling programme. The men's and women's individual pursuit and points race, and the men's Madison were removed. Team sprint, team pursuit and keirin were added to the women's programme, while Omnium was a new race for both men and women. Countries were restricted to one entry per track event, a restriction which seemed to be directed at preventing the British team from double-medalling in the same event as they had in four events in 2008, thus lowering their medal chances.  However, similar to the 2008 Beijing Games, the cycling events were dominated by the British team, which, with a haul including eight gold medals, was the only one to win more than a single gold medal.

Venues
The road racing at the Olympics and Paralympic Games was originally scheduled to take place in Regent's Park and on Hampstead Heath. Instead, the Olympic road races started and finished on The Mall in central London and headed out in a south-westerly direction to include loops around Box Hill in Surrey. Road racing in the Paralympics took place at Brands Hatch. The Olympic mountain bike event took place at Hadleigh Farm after the UCI labeled the course at Weald Country Park "too easy" in July 2008. It was touted that the course could be created in Wales. A location in Kent was also considered.

Qualification

Participating nations

Cyclists from 74 nations participated at the 2012 Summer Olympics.

Competition schedule

M = Morning session, A = Afternoon sessionFL = Flying Lap, PR = Points Race, ER = Elimination Race, IP = Individual Pursuit, SR = Scratch Race, TT = Time Trial

Medal table

Road cycling

Track cycling

Men

Women

Mountain biking

BMX

Broken records

References

External links

 
 
 
 
 
 
 
 
 

 
2012 Summer Olympics events
2012
Olympics
Olympics
International cycle races hosted by the United Kingdom